Long intergenic non-protein coding RNA 1003 is a protein that in humans is encoded by the LINC01003 gene.

References